is a passenger railway station located in the city of Higashiōmi, Shiga, Japan, operated by the West Japan Railway Company (JR West).

Lines

Station layout
The station consists of one side platform and one island platform connected by an elevated station building. The station is staffed.

Platforms

Adjacent stations

History

Station numbering was introduced in March 2018 with Notogawa being assigned station number JR-A17.

Passenger statistics
In fiscal 2019, the station was used by an average of 7201 passengers daily (boarding passengers only).

Surrounding area
Higashiomi City Hall Notogawa Branch (formerly Notogawa Town Hall)
Higashiomi City Notogawa Library
Higashiomi City Notogawa Museum
Notogawa Sports Center
Hayashi Central Park
Higashiomi City Notogawa Junior High School

See also
List of railway stations in Japan

References

External links

JR West official home page

Railway stations in Japan opened in 1889
Tōkaidō Main Line
Railway stations in Shiga Prefecture
Higashiōmi